The National Circuit Grand Prix Finals is a tournament organized by the Badminton Association of Malaysia to crown the best badminton players in Malaysia. The tournament started in the 1980s and is held annually.

Location of the National Circuit Grand Prix Finals
The table below gives an overview of all host cities of the National Circuit Grand Prix Finals.

Past winners

Successful players
Below is the list of the most ever successful players in the National Circuit Grand Prix Finals:

References

Malaysian National Championships
National championships in Malaysia